Cephenemyia apicata is a species of nose bot flies in the family Oestridae. Its larvae are parasites of Odocoileus hemionus columbianus, and in their first instar can be found in the deer's lungs. Adults typically mate from April through late July.

References

Oestridae
Articles created by Qbugbot
Insects described in 1962
Parasitic arthropods of mammals